Meshack Lufile (born October 21, 1992) is a Canadian professional basketball player for Reading Rockets of the NBL. 

Born in Burlington, Ontario Lufile made his professional debut with Aris Leeuwarden of the Dutch Basketball League.  In July 2020, Meshack launched his official website to keep fans up to date about his career.

Professional career
On June 16, 2016, Lufile signed with Aris Leeuwarden of the Dutch Basketball League. Lufile re-signed for a second year with Aris in July 2017. On November 9, 2017, Lufile was released by Aris.
On December 30, 2017, Lufile signed with the Island Storm, a team based out of his native country in the National Basketball League of Canada. He joined the Halifax Hurricanes in 2018. He joined the Guelph Nighthawks of the Canadian Elite Basketball League for its inaugural season in 2019. Lufile joined CSM Miercurea Ciuc of the Romanian league in 2019. He averaged 16.2 points and 9.0 rebounds per game. On August 23, 2021, Lufile signed with the Reading Rockets of the English NBL.

Personal life
Meshack's brothers Chadrack Lufile and Abednego Lufile are professional basketball players as well. Abednego Lufile currently plays for the London Lightning in London, Canada. Meshack Lufile also has a younger brother named Elijah Lufile who is on a basketball scholarship at Oral Roberts University of the NCAA I.

References

1992 births
Living people
Aris Leeuwarden players
Basketball people from Ontario
Canadian expatriate basketball people in the Netherlands
Canadian expatriate sportspeople in England
Canadian expatriate basketball people in Romania
Canadian men's basketball players
Centers (basketball)
Cape Breton Highlanders (basketball) players
Halifax Hurricanes players
Island Storm players
Guelph Nighthawks players
Sportspeople from Burlington, Ontario
Black Canadian sportspeople
Canadian people of Democratic Republic of the Congo descent
Canadian sportspeople of African descent
Canadian expatriate basketball people in the United Kingdom